Bly is a surname. Notable people with the surname include:

 Carol Bly, short story writer
 John Bly, English antiques specialist
 Mary Bly, author who publishes under the name Eloisa James 
 Nellie Bly, pen name of Elizabeth Cochrane Seaman, American journalist, author, industrialist, and charity worker
 Robert Bly (1926–2021), author of Iron John (book)
 Terry Bly (1935–2009), footballer who played for Norwich City and Peterborough United